Orthalicus maracaibensis is a species of air-breathing land snail, a terrestrial pulmonate gastropod mollusk in the family Orthalicidae.

Subspecies 
 Orthalicus maracaibensis noesiotus - photo of shell

Distribution 
 Venezuela

References

Further reading 
 Ordosgoitti A. 1999. Caracoles plagas de cítricas en Yumare, Estado Yaracuy. Agronoía Tropical, 49, 517–525.

External links 
 Some blog info

Orthalicidae